Andrea Rentmeister (born 28 December 1977) is an Austrian chemist and fencer. She competed in the women's individual épée event at the 2000 Summer Olympics. After completing her studies of chemical engineering and chemistry at the Universities of Graz and Bonn, earning her a PhD, she became a postdoctoral researcher at the lab of the 2018 Nobel Laureate Frances Arnold at the California Institute of Technology (Caltech) in 2007. In 2010 she became a junior professor for Biochemistry at the University of Hamburg. Currently, she holds a position as professor for biomolecular label chemistry at the University of Münster.

References

1977 births
Living people
Austrian female épée fencers
Olympic fencers of Austria
Fencers at the 2000 Summer Olympics
Sportspeople from Graz
Academic staff of the University of Münster
German women academics
Austrian chemists